Luis Esteban Galarza Mayereger (born 26 December 1950) is a Bolivian football coach and former player who played as a goalkeeper.

Born in Paraguay, Galarza played in 17 matches for the Bolivia national football team from 1977 to 1989. He was also part of Bolivia's squad for the 1987 Copa América tournament.

Galarza's sons Sergio and Luis were also footballers and goalkeepers.

References

External links
 

1950 births
Living people
Bolivian footballers
Bolivia international footballers
Association football goalkeepers
Sportspeople from Asunción
Club Real Potosí managers
Club Aurora managers
Club Blooming managers
The Strongest players
Club Always Ready players
Club Bolívar players
Club Blooming players
C.D. Jorge Wilstermann players
Club Independiente Petrolero players
Club San José players